Catharine Anastasia Conley was NASA's 6th Planetary Protection Officer from 2006 through 2018.

Education
Conley received her bachelor's from MIT, a Ph.D. in Plant Biology from Cornell University in 1994, and obtained a postdoctoral fellow position at The Scripps Research Institute studying proteins involved in muscle contraction. Conley conducted some of her research using the nematode Caenorhabditis elegans.

NASA career
In 1999 Conley became a research scientist with the NASA Ames Research Center. Her research focuses on the evolution of motility, particularly animal muscle. One of her experiments was on board during the Space Shuttle Columbia disaster. The experiment, the fourteenth Biological Research In Canisters (BRIC-14), survived re-entry and the nematode cultures were still alive. Some scientific data was recovered.

In 2006, Conley was appointed as NASA's Planetary Protection Officer (see Planetary protection), replacing John Rummel. A NASA re-organization opened the job for competition in 2017, and Conley was replaced by Dr. Lisa Pratt in February 2018.

References

Living people
Cornell University College of Agriculture and Life Sciences alumni
NASA people
Scripps Research alumni
Year of birth missing (living people)